The discography of Venezuelan pop duo Chino & Nacho consists of four studio albums, one compilation album and fifteen singles.

Albums

Studio albums

Extended plays

Singles 

Notes
A.  "Niña Bonita" did not enter the Billboard Hot 100, but peaked at number 4 on the Bubbling Under Hot 100 Singles chart, which acts as a 25-song extension to the Hot 100.

As featured artist

References 
General

 
 

Specific

Reggaeton discographies
Discographies of Venezuelan artists
Tropical music discographies